Deuli may refer to:
Deuli, Bangladesh
 Deuli, India
 Deuli, Canning, census town in South 24 Parganas district, West Bengal, India